Lukyanovka is a rural locality (a selo) in Kustanayevsky Selsoviet of Belogorsky District, Amur Oblast, Russia. The population is 139 as of 2018. There are 2 streets.

Geography 
Lukyanovka is located 26 km southwest of Belogorsk (the district's administrative centre) by road. Kustanayevka is the nearest rural locality.

References 

Rural localities in Belogorsky District